Pannonian Rusyns, also known as Pannonian Rusnaks, and formerly known as Yugoslav Rusyns (during the existence of former Yugoslavia),  are ethnic Rusyns from the southern regions of the Pannonian Plain (hence, Pannonian Rusyns). Their communities are located mainly in Vojvodina (in modern Serbia), and Slavonia (in modern Croatia). In both of those countries, they are officially recognized as a national minority, and have several minority institutions and organizations. 

In some non-Slavic languages, they are sometimes also referred to by certain archaic exonyms, such as Pannonian Ruthenes or Pannonian Ruthenians, but those terms are not used in the native Rusyn language. Such terms are also imprecise, since Ruthenian and related exonyms have several broader meanings, both in terms of their historical uses and ethnic scopes, that are encompassing various East Slavic groups.

Geographical Pannonian adjective is used as a neutral term of convenience, since the previous geographical ethnonym (Yugoslav Rusyns) became significantly reduced in scope after the breakup of major Yugoslavia (1991-1992), and also obsolete when the reduced Federal Republic of Yugoslavia changed its name to Serbia and Montenegro (2003). In order to avoid confusion, the term Pannonian Rusyns is used in modern English terminology as a descriptive regional ethnonym for Rusyn communities in all of those regions, similar to the way the term North American Rusyns is used to refer to the Rusyn diasporas in the USA and Canada.

Pannonian Rusyns are descendants of 18th-century migrant communities, that came from northeastern (Carpathian) regions, still inhabited today by other groups of (Carpathian) Rusyns, who live in southwestern Ukraine, northeastern Slovakia, southeastern Poland, northern Romania, and northeastern Hungary.

History

During the 18th century, state authorities of the Habsburg monarchy initiated several programs of re-population and colonization of various regions that were recently liberated from the Ottoman rule. Since 1745, groups of Rusyns from north-eastern Carpatian regions of the Kingdom of Hungary (eastern parts of modern Slovakia and Carpathian regions of modern Ukraine) started to migrate towards southern regions, including Bačka, Srem and Slavonia. The first group settled in the village of Kula in Bačka (modern Serbia), as attested by the 1746 census.

During the following years, process of Rusyn colonization was intensified, and on 17 January 1751, regional administrator of Bačka, Franz Joseph von Redl signed an agreement with Mihajlo Munkači from the village of Červenovo, in the county of Bereg, allowing the arrival of 200 Rusyn families from the north-eastern Hungarian region known as the "Upper-Land" to the village of Krstur in Bačka. The same administrator signed another agreement on 15 May 1763 with Petro Kiš from Kerestur, allowing the arrival of 150 Rusyn families from the "Upper-Land" to the village of Kucura in Bačka. Both agreements, from 1751 and 1763, contained special clauses, requiring that Rusyn colonists in terms of their religious affiliation have to be Eastern Catholics.

As the population grew, many families from Krstur and Kucura migrated to the town of Novi Sad in 1766 and 1767. The census from 1767 for the whole Bács-Bodrog County (which then was part of Habsburg Monarchy and today comprises Bačka region in Serbia and Hungary) shows about 2.000 Rusyns. Later, Rusyns settled in Šid and Vajska, and in the early 19th century in Vukovar and Ilok. In Petrovci, Rusyns started to settle in 1833, and later in Bačinci in 1834.

Rusyns in former Yugoslavia

After the Dissolution of the Austro-Hungarian Monarchy (1918), southern Pannonian regions became part of the newly formed Kingdom of Serbs, Croats and Slovenes, known since 1929 as the Kingdom of Yugoslavia. Since it was a South Slavic country, position of various Slavic minorities (including local Rusyns) was improved significantly, particularly in the fields of their cultural development and elementary education. During the interwar period (1918-1941), several Rusyn cultural organizations and periodical publications were established.

After the Second World War, in the socialist Yugoslavia, Rusyns were officially recognized as a distinct national minority, and their legal status was regulated in Yugoslav federal units of Serbia and Croatia. In the Constitution of Serbia, that was adopted on 9 April 1963, Rusyns were designated as one of seven (explicitly named) national minorities (Article 82), and the same provision was implemented in the Statute of Vojvodina (an autonomous province in Serbia) that was adopted in the same year (Articles 32-37). Further on, the Constitutional Law of 21 February 1969 regulated the position of Rusyn language as one of five official languages in Vojvodina (Article 67). 

In spite of the fact that constitutional and legal recognition of Rusyn minority and its language in Vojvodina (Serbia) was achieved already in 1963/1969, some authors have overlooked those developments, and also claimed (persistently, in several works) that such recognition occurred later, in 1974, thus revealing the lack of basic knowledge on the evolution of Rusyn rights in former Yugoslavia. Those early developments (1963/1969) are also omitted from some scholarly analyses that are dedicated explicitly to the legal status of Rusyns in Vojvodina.

During the same period, Rusyn minority was also recognized in the Yugoslav federal unit of Croatia, by the Constitutional Amendment IV, that was adopted in 1972. That provision was confirmed by the new Constitution of Croatia, adopted in 1974 (Article 137), that recognized not only local Rusyns but also local Ukrainians, thus designating them as separate and distinct national minorities. 

In terms of their cultural development in socialist Yugoslavia, Rusyns had several institutions and organizations. Already in 1945, а publishing establishment, called the Rusyn Word was founded, in Novi Sad. It became the main center for publication of Rusyn newspapers, literary works and school textbooks. In the same year, Rusyn high school was opened in Ruski Krstur. In 1970, the Society for Rusyn Language an Literature was established, in Novi Sad. Since 1972, at the Faculty of Philosophy (University of Novi Sad), Rusyn studies were initiated, and the Chair for Rusyn Language and Literature was established in 1983.

Rusyns in modern Serbia and Croatia

After the breakup of Yugoslavia (1991–1992), its successor states continued to recognize Rusyns as a distinct national minority. In Croatia, they are officially recognized (under constitutional provisions from 1997) as an autochthonous national minority and as such, they elect a special representative to the Croatian Parliament, shared with members of eleven other national minorities. 

In Serbia, recognition of Rusyn minority and its language was confirmed by the provincial statutes of Vojvodina (2009, 2014). Since 2002, Rusyns in Serbia have their autonomously elected representative body, the National Council of the Rusyn National Minority, headquartered in Ruski Krstur (the largest Rusyn settlement in Serbia). At the Faculty of Philosophy (University of Novi Sad), Rusyn studies were expanded in 2002, and the Department of Rusynistics was established. In 2008, the Institute for Culture of Rusyns in Vojvodina was founded, centered in Novi Sad.

Demographics
Rusyns in modern states of Serbia and Croatia mostly live in the autonomous province of Vojvodina (Serbia), and in the region of Slavonia (Croatia). The census from 1991 in those regions (then within former Yugoslavia) shows about 25.000 Rusyns. Currently, the number of Rusyns declines and is estimated to be about 15.000. The main reason for this is the economic migration, since the increasing number of Rusyns is deciding to move to western countries, particularly to Canada.

There are 14,246 declared ethnic Rusyns in Serbia (2011 census). In terms of religious affiliation, 94,91% declared as Christians (75,43% Catholics, 18,53% Orthodox, 0,7% Protestansts).

The village of Ruski Krstur in the Kula municipality is the cultural centre of Rusyns in Serbia. Other villages with a Rusyn majority include Kucura in the Vrbas municipality, and Bikić Do in the Šid municipality. There is a considerable concentration of Rusyns in Novi Sad, where in 1820 the construction of St. Peter and Paul Greek Catholic parish church started and was subsequently completed in 1834/1837. 

There are Rusyn communities in Slavonia (Croatia), forming a majority in the village of Petrovci, Bogdanovci municipality, in Vukovar-Srijem county.

Serbia
 Ruski Krstur (86%, 2002)
 Bikić Do (47,62%, 2002)
 Kucura (47,18%, 2002)
 Đurđevo (23,30%, 2002)

Croatia
 Petrovci, Croatia (57,17%, 1991)

Language

Rusyns in Serbia and Croatia consider their linguistic variety, known as Pannonian Rusyn, to be one of four standardized versions of the Rusyn language, while some linguists also classify it as a microlanguage. They are using a standardized version of Rusyn Cyrillic alphabet.

Rusyn is one of the six official languages of provincial administration in Vojvodina, while in Croatia it is officially used in two settlements.

Notable people

 Jaša Bakov, Rusyn athlete and activist from Serbia
 Mihail Dudaš, Rusyn athlete from Serbia
 Đura Džudžar, Rusyn bishop from Serbia
 Ljubomir Fejsa, Rusyn footballer from Serbia
 Joakim Herbut, Rusyn bishop from Serbia
 Ivan Lenđer, Rusyn swimmer from Serbia
 Slavomir Miklovš, Rusyn bishop from Serbia
 Olena Papuga, Rusyn politician from Serbia
 Silvester Takač, Rusyn footballer from Serbia
 Danijela Štajnfeld, Rusyn actress from Serbia

References

Other sources

External links

 Rusyns in Croatia
 National Council of the Rusyn National Minority, in Serbia

 
Rusyns
Rusyn diaspora
Slavic ethnic groups
Ethnic groups in Vojvodina
Ethnic groups in Serbia
Ethnic groups in Croatia
Ethnic groups in Yugoslavia